Hasle Church may refer to:
 Hasle Church, a church in Aarhus, Denmark
 Hasle Church, a church on the island of Bornholm, Denmark
 Hasle Church, a church in Oslo, Norway